Captain John Price is a fictional character in the Call of Duty series. He is the main protagonist of the original Modern Warfare sub-series. In the trilogy, Price first ranked as a lieutenant, before being promoted to Captain and taking charge of a Special Air Service squad. He later becomes a leading member of an international task force, "141". Another version of Price features as one of the main protagonists in the rebooted Modern Warfare sub-series. Both versions of the character have been well received by critics, with the original becoming one of the most popular Call of Duty characters.

Character design
The first iteration of Captain Price was in Call of Duty. Initially a captain of D Company, 2nd (Airborne) Battalion Oxfordshire and Buckinghamshire Light Infantry charged with seizing Pegasus Bridge prior to the Invasion of Normandy, Price is later seconded to 3 Troop, Special Air Service (SAS) along with the player character, Sergeant Jack Evans. He would appear again in Call of Duty 2, this time as a captain in the 7th Armoured Division, fighting in the North African campaign and then later in the Battle for Caen. The character design borrowed heavily from Michael Graham Cox's portrayal of Captain Jimmy Cleminson in the ensemble war movie A Bridge Too Far. Cleminson sported a large moustache.

The character's third appearance was as a Captain in the SAS in Call of Duty 4: Modern Warfare, followed by further appearances in Call of Duty: Modern Warfare 2 and Call of Duty: Modern Warfare 3. Still bearing a large moustache, this modern take on Captain Price drew further inspiration from British SAS soldier John McAleese, who was involved in the Iranian Embassy siege and also co-hosted the television series SAS: Are You Tough Enough? in 2003. McAleese was also well known for his large moustache. Price's callsign, Bravo Six, is a direct reference to the 1986 war film Platoon, in which Captain Harris' callsign is exactly the same as Price's. Much of Price's design in the original Modern Warfare trilogy is carried over into the 2019 reboot, which features a new iteration of the character. Over the course of the franchise, Captain John Price has been portrayed by Michael Gough, Billy Murray and Barry Sloane.

In an interview with Sami Onur, a character designer for Infinity Ward, the explanation was provided that John Price is the grandson of the Price who appeared in early Call of Duty games, though this has not yet been confirmed by Infinity Ward staff. In the early developments of Modern Warfare 2, Price was scheduled to be the player's commander, not "Soap" MacTavish, as he was supposed to be the playable character instead of Roach. This is further explained in the artbook for Modern Warfare 2.

Appearances

Modern Warfare (original trilogy)
In Call of Duty 4: Modern Warfare, Captain Price serves as the commanding officer of primary protagonist John "Soap" MacTavish. He is also the player character for two flashback missions set in Pripyat in 1996, these being "All Ghillied Up" and "One Shot One Kill". The missions explore an assassination attempt on main antagonist Imran Zakhaev. At the conclusion of the game, he is severely wounded in a tanker truck explosion, but passes an M1911 pistol to Soap so he can kill Zakhaev.

Price survives this incident, and is encountered again in Call of Duty: Modern Warfare 2. He is discovered imprisoned by terrorist Vladimir Makarov after an attempt to capture him gone awry, and joins Task Force 141 in an attempt to stop a war between the United States and Russia. However, Task Force 141 is betrayed by their commanding officer, General Shepherd, who orchestrated the war in order to raise American patriotism and become a war hero. Price and Soap embark on a suicide mission to kill Shepherd and avenge their comrades; they succeed in doing so, although Task Force 141 is disavowed and they are labelled terrorists.

In Call of Duty: Modern Warfare 3, Price and Soap ally with Yuri, an ex-Spetsnaz operative, and Team Metal, a Delta Force fireteam, to kill Makarov and clear their names. During an assassination attempt in Prague, Makarov reveals he has a history with Yuri and kills Soap. Price learns that Yuri was formerly an associate of Makarov, but betrayed him during a terrorist attack on a civilian airport. The two work with Team Metal to rescue the Russian president and his daughter from Makarov, ending the war and clearing their names; Team Metal is killed in the battle. Several months later, Price and Yuri launch an assault on a hotel owned by Makarov and finally kill him at the cost of Yuri's life.

Modern Warfare (reboot)
In Call of Duty: Modern Warfare (2019), Captain Price returns to the campaign, which takes place in a new timeline. He is portrayed by actor Barry Sloane.

Price is contacted by CIA agent Kate Laswell about the Russian nerve gas crisis. Given its threat status, he agreed to finish this operation. When London was attacked by Al-Qatala Price leads his Bravo team to contain the situation. Then, after a raid on a Al-Qatala terror cell in townhouse, intelligence shown the leader' name: Omar "The Wolf" Sulaiman. After the crisis ends and Barkov disowned by Russia for his action, Price meets up with Laswell to discuss the formation of Task Force 141, with few names up for consideration: his subordinate, Kyle "Gaz" Garrick, John "Soap" MacTavish, and Simon "Ghost" Riley.

In Call of Duty: Modern Warfare II, the sequel to the reboot, Price plays a semi-major role in the campaign. In order to pursue Hassan Zyani, a Quds Force Major and the new leader of Al-Qatala, they pursue one of his couriers in Amsterdam, revealing it to be the Las Almas Cartel. Price, Gaz and Laswell then go to Spain after tracing Hassan's phone to a Las Almas owned fishing hatchery, where Laswell is captured by Al-Qatala. Price, Gaz and Farah and Nikolai from the previous game return to Urzikstan to retrieve Laswell. After Soap, Ghost and Alejandro Vargas, a Mexican Special Forces operative, are betrayed by General Shephard and Shadow Company, Price and Gaz assault the prison and rescue them, and launch an assault to reclaim their base. Price, Soap, Gaz, Ghost and Laswell then head to Chicago to stop Hassan from launching a captured ballistic missile at Washington D.C, where he and Soap is injured. Soap and Ghost eventually kill Hassan, and in a post-credits scene, Laswell informs Price, Soap, Ghost and Gaz about a Russian Ultranationalist known as Vladimir Makarov.

Warzone
Shortly after the events of the first game, Price and Laswell begin to monitor a series of special classified operations in the city of Verdansk, Kastovia, where the Al-Qatala have been operating following a resurgence under a new leader, Khaled Al-Asad. Al-Asad eventually cooperates with Russian terrorist Victor Zakhaev to release chemical gas across Verdansk. Operators across Eastern and Western countries work together under the name "Armistice" to apprehend Al-Asad and Zakhaev. Eventually, Price himself is deployed to Verdansk alongside Gaz to assist Task Force 141 members Ghost and Alex. Ultimately, with the help of Urzik rebel leader Farah Karim and Russian weapons dealer Nikolai, they locate Zakhaev attempting to activate a nuclear missile, and stop the launch, killing Zakhaev in the process.

Other appearances
Captain Price appears in the mobile game Call of Duty: Heroes as the first hero to be unlocked and has a statue skin that can be unlocked for 250 Celerium. Captain Price is also a playable Blackout character in Call of Duty: Black Ops 4 if the digital or physical edition of Call of Duty: Modern Warfare was pre-ordered. Price also appears in the "Captain Price: Legend Pack", a DLC for Call of Duty: Ghosts on where he appears as a playable multiplayer character.

The reboot version of Captain Price appears in Treyarch's Call of Duty: Black Ops Cold War and Call of Duty: Mobile as a bonus playable Operator in Multiplayer and Zombies modes, with Barry Sloane reprising his voice over role.

Reception
The character of Captain Price received critical acclaim. This praise included Captain Price being ranked as eight on Game Informer list of "30 Characters Who Defined a Decade" and voted as 17th top video game character of all time in Guinness World Records 2011 Gamers' Edition. He was also one of the 64 characters chosen for GameSpot "All-Time Greatest Sidekick" poll, while voted as the eighth-top character of the 2000s decade by Game Informer readers, and Complex in 2013 ranked Price as the 26th greatest soldier in video games. In 2008, The Age ranked Price as the eighth-greatest Xbox character of all time, calling him "the most familiar of the Call of Duty supporting cast and a damn fine army man indeed" and saying "What a guy; what a [mous]'tache." A GamesRadar article demanded "a whole game" exclusively starring Price because "Call of Duty 4 best dialogue comes from Captain Price" as well as its "best missions are the ones in which you play as Captain Price." GamesRadar staff further placed him at number 41 in a list of the 50 best game characters of the generation, commenting, "Arguably no other character in the history of games goes harder than Captain John Price. ... Truly, the man is a badass." He was also ranked as the 48th "most memorable, influential, and badass" protagonist in video games history. 

Matthew Wilkinson of TheGamer ranked Captain Price the third-greatest Call of Duty character, writing "Never showing fear, Captain Price was a true leader amongst men and is probably the most iconic character in the Call of Duty series", while Wireds July Muncy called Price the series most iconic character. Jeremy Peel of PC Gamer felt that the rebooted Price "torturing in my name" and "played by a former soap opera serial killer" should not have been likeable, but ultimately "exudes the demeanour of an endearingly drunk uncle." In 2016, Glixel staff ranked Price as the 27th most iconic video game character of the 21st century, while In 2021, Rachel Weber of GamesRadar ranked him as 37th iconic video game character.

Justin Davis of IGN described Captain Price's mustache as "glorious", and stated that "Sometimes Price has a full beard. But let's make one thing clear - moustache Price is best Price." Australian Broadcasting Corporation also included Price's moustache on their "best gaming moustaches", stating that "this hairy hedgerow of a moustachery stretches from ear to ear and covers most of Captain Price's face in an impenetrable forest of facial fur."

A cameo appearance of Price mocking Nadeshot has been made as an advertise of Call of Duty: Warzone.

References

External links

Activision characters
Fictional assassins in video games
Call of Duty
Fictional British people in video games
Fictional British secret agents
Fictional British Commandos
Fictional British Army officers
Fictional military captains
Fictional British military snipers
Fictional prisoners of war
Fictional outlaws
Fictional sole survivors
Fictional Somali Civil War veterans
Fictional torturers and interrogators
Fictional Gulf War veterans
Fictional Special Air Service personnel
Fictional United Nations personnel
Fictional World War III veterans
Male characters in video games
Fictional soldiers in video games
Video game characters based on real people
Video game characters introduced in 2007
Video game mascots
Video game protagonists
First-person shooter characters